Donald E. Murphy (born July 8, 1960) was a member of the Maryland House of Delegates, representing District 12A, which covered portions of Baltimore and Howard County Maryland.  He served alongside Democrat James E. Malone Jr.  In 1993, he defeated Democratic incumbent Kenneth H. Masters.

Education
Murphy graduated from the former Andover High School, in Linthicum, Maryland.   He later graduated from the University of Baltimore with his bachelor's degree in real estate and science in 1983.

Career
Murphy was and continues to be a real estate consultant.  He was a delegate to the Republican Party National Convention.  He was the chair of the [www.baltimorecountyrepublicans.org Baltimore County Republican Central Committee] from 2002 until 2003. He is a co-founder of the Patapsco Valley Republican Club and a past president of the Holmehurst Community Association.

While a member of the Maryland House of Delegates, he was a member of the Judiciary Committee and the civil law and procedure subcommittee. He served as Deputy Minority Whip from 2002 until 2003.  Murphy did not seek reelection in 2002.

Murphy is now a GOP strategist, serving in 2010 as advisor to Senate candidate Dr. Eric Wargotz of Maryland, according to Fox News.

Currently, Murphy works as a federal-policies analyst for the Marijuana Policy Project (MPP), a national group looking to liberalize laws on marijuana.  As state delegate he had sponsored the first medical marijuana protection bill.

Election results 
1998 Race for Maryland House of Delegates – District 12A
Voters to choose two:
{| class="wikitable"
|-
!Name
!Votes
!Percent
!Outcome
|-
|-
|James E. Malone Jr., Dem.
|13,222
|  31%
|   Won
|-
|-
|Donald E. Murphy, Rep.
|10,920
|  26%
|   Won
|-
|-
|Steven J. DeBoy, Sr., Dem.
|10,669
|  25%
|   Lost
|-
|-
|Loyd V. Smith, Rep.
|7,245
|  17%
|   Lost
|-
|}

1994 Race for Maryland House of Delegates – District 12A
Voters to choose two:
{| class="wikitable"
|-
!Name
!Votes
!Percent
!Outcome
|-
|-
|Donald E. Murphy, Rep.
|10,340
|  27%
|   Won
|-
|-
|James E. Malone Jr., Dem.
|9,712
|  25%
|   Won
|-
|-
|Donald Drehoff, Rep.
|9,596
|  25%
|   Lost
|-
|-
|Kenneth H. Masters, Dem.
|8,527
|  22%
|   Lost
|-
|}

References and notes

See also
 http://www.msa.md.gov/msa/mdmanual/06hse/former/html/msa12279.html Maryland Manual

People from Baltimore County, Maryland
Republican Party members of the Maryland House of Delegates
Living people
University of Baltimore alumni
1960 births
People from Linthicum, Maryland